The following is an alphabetical list of topics related to the Republic of El Salvador.

0–9

.sv – Internet country code top-level domain for El Salvador

A
Abortion
Adjacent countries:

Americas
North America
Central America
North Pacific Ocean
Islands of El Salvador
Atlas of El Salvador
Antiguo Cuscatlan

C
Capital of El Salvador:  San Salvador
Categories:
:Category:El Salvador
:Category:Buildings and structures in El Salvador
:Category:Burials in El Salvador
:Category:Communications in El Salvador
:Category:Economy of El Salvador
:Category:Education in El Salvador
:Category:El Salvador stubs
:Category:El Salvador-related lists
:Category:Environment of El Salvador
:Category:Geography of El Salvador
:Category:Government of El Salvador
:Category:Health in El Salvador
:Category:History of El Salvador
:Category:Law enforcement in El Salvador
:Category:Law of El Salvador

:Category:Military of El Salvador
:Category:Politics of El Salvador
:Category:Salvadoran culture
:Category:Salvadoran people
:Category:Society of El Salvador
:Category:Sport in El Salvador
:Category:Transport in El Salvador
commons:Category:El Salvador
Central America
Coat of arms of El Salvador
Cuscatlan International Airport

D
Demographics of El Salvador
Diplomatic missions of El Salvador

E
Economy of El Salvador
El Salvador
El Salvador under Mexican rule
Elections in El Salvador

F

Flag of El Salvador

G
Geography of El Salvador
Golfo de Fonseca (Gulf of Fonseca)

H
History of El Salvador

I
International Organization for Standardization (ISO)
ISO 3166-1 alpha-2 country code for El Salvador: SV
ISO 3166-1 alpha-3 country code for El Salvador: SLV
ISO 3166-2:SV region codes for El Salvador
Islands of El Salvador

L
Latin America
Latin American culture
Legislative Assembly of El Salvador
LGBT rights in El Salvador (Gay rights)
Lists related to El Salvador:
Diplomatic missions of El Salvador
Islands of El Salvador
List of diplomatic missions in El Salvador
List of El Salvador-related topics
List of football clubs in El Salvador
List of islands of El Salvador
List of political parties in El Salvador
List of Salvadorans
Topic outline of El Salvador

M
Military of El Salvador
Music of El Salvador

N
North America
Non-profits: ASAPROSAR

P
Pipil people
Politics of El Salvador
Postage stamps and postal history of El Salvador
President of El Salvador

R
Republic of El Salvador (República de El Salvador, literally "Republic of The Savior")
El Salvador national rugby league team

S
Salvador (film)
Salvadorans
Salvadoran Civil War
San Salvador – Capital of El Salvador
Scouting in El Salvador
Spanish colonization of the Americas
Spanish language

T
Topic outline of El Salvador
Transport in El Salvador

U
United Nations founding member state 1945
University of El Salvador

W
Water supply and sanitation in El Salvador

Wikipedia:WikiProject Topic outline/Drafts/Topic outline of El Salvador

See also

List of Central America-related topics
List of international rankings
Lists of country-related topics
Topic outline of El Salvador
Topic outline of geography
Topic outline of North America
United Nations

References

External links

 
El Salvador